is a railway station on the Myōkō Haneuma Line in the city of Jōetsu, Niigata, Japan, operated by the third-sector operating railway company Echigo Tokimeki Railway.

Lines

Station layout
The station has one side platform serving a single bi-directional track, with the station building located directly on the platform. The station is unattended.

Adjacent stations

History
The station opened on 10 December 1961 on the Shinetsu Main Line. With the privatization of JNR on 1 April 1987, the station came under the control of JR East.

From this date, Minami-Takada Station became a station on the Echigo Tokimeki Railway Myōkō Haneuma Line.

Passenger statistics
In fiscal 2017, the station was used by an average of 835 passengers daily (boarding passengers only).

Surrounding area
 Takada Commercial High School

See also
 List of railway stations in Japan

References

External links

 Echigo Tokimeki Railway Station information 
 Timetable for Minami-Takada Station 

Railway stations in Niigata Prefecture
Railway stations in Japan opened in 1961
Stations of Echigo Tokimeki Railway
Jōetsu, Niigata